The Evening Advocate was a newspaper published in Innisfail, Queensland, Australia.

Digitisation 
The paper has been digitised as part of the Australian Newspapers Digitisation Program of the National Library of Australia.

References

External links

Evening Advocate
Innisfail, Queensland
Newspapers on Trove